In organic chemistry, neighbouring group participation (NGP, also known as anchimeric assistance) has been defined by the International Union of Pure and Applied Chemistry (IUPAC) as the interaction of a reaction centre with a lone pair of electrons in an atom or the electrons present in a pi bond contained within the parent molecule but not conjugated with the reaction centre. When NGP is in operation it is normal for the reaction rate to be increased. It is also possible for the stereochemistry of the reaction to be abnormal (or unexpected) when compared with a normal reaction. While it is possible for neighbouring groups to influence many reactions in organic chemistry (e.g. the reaction of a diene such as 1,3-cyclohexadiene with maleic anhydride normally gives the endo isomer because of a secondary effect {overlap of the carbonyl group π orbitals with the transition state in the Diels-Alder reaction}) this page is limited to neighbouring group effects seen with carbocations and SN2 reactions.

NGP by heteroatom lone pairs 
In this type of substitution reaction, one group of the substrate participates initially in the reaction and thereby affects the reaction. Due to NGP, the reaction rate gets increased by many folds. 
A classic example of NGP is the reaction of a sulfur or nitrogen mustard with a nucleophile, the rate of reaction is much higher for the sulfur mustard and a nucleophile than it would be for a primary or secondary alkyl chloride without a heteroatom.

NGP by an alkene 

The π orbitals of an alkene can stabilize a transition state by helping to delocalize the positive charge of the carbocation. For instance the unsaturated tosylate will react more quickly (1011 times faster for aqueous solvolysis) with a nucleophile than the saturated tosylate.

The carbocationic intermediate will be stabilized by resonance where the positive charge is spread over several atoms. In the diagram below this is shown.

Here is a different view of the same intermediates.

Even if the alkene is more remote from the reacting center the alkene can still act in this way. For instance in the following alkyl benzenesulfonate the alkene is able to delocalise the carbocation.

Also the increase in the rate of the SN2 reaction of allyl bromide with a nucleophile compared with the reaction of n-propyl bromide is because the orbitals of the π bond overlap with those of the transition state. In the allyl system the alkene orbitals overlap with the orbitals of a SN2 transition state.

NGP by a cyclopropane, cyclobutane or a homoallyl group 

If Cyclopropylmethyl chloride is reacted with ethanol and water then a mixture of 48% cyclopropylmethyl alcohol, 47% cyclobutanol and 5% homoallyl alcohol (but-3-enol) is obtained. This is because the carbocationic intermediate is delocalised onto many different carbons through a reversible ring opening.

NGP by an aromatic ring 

In the case of a benzyl halide the reactivity is higher because the SN2 transition state enjoys a similar overlap effect to that in the allyl system according to the molecular orbital theory.

An aromatic ring can assist in the formation of a carbocationic intermediate called a phenonium ion  by delocalising the positive charge.

When the following tosylate reacts with acetic acid in solvolysis then rather than a simple SN2 reaction forming B, a 48:48:4 mixture of A, B (which are enantiomers) and C+D was obtained  . 

The mechanism which forms A and B is shown below.

NGP by aliphatic C-C or C-H bonds  
Aliphatic C-C or C-H bonds can lead to charge delocalization if these bonds are close and antiperiplanar to the leaving group. Corresponding intermediates are referred to a nonclassical ions, with the 2-norbornyl system as the most well known case.

External links 
 IUPAC definition

References 

  Advanced organic chemistry, page 314, Jerry March (4th Ed), Wiley-Interscience.
  Studies in Stereochemistry. I. The Stereospecific Wagner-Meerwein rearrangement of the Isomers of 3-Phenyl-2-butanol Donald J. Cram J. Am. Chem. Soc.; 1949; 71(12); 3863-3870. Abstract
   Studies in Stereochemistry. V. Phenonium Sulfonate Ion-pairs as Intermediates in the Intramolecular Rearrangements and Solvolysis Reactions that Occur in the 3-Phenyl-2-butanol System Donald J. Cram J. Am. Chem. Soc.; 1952; 74(9); 2129-2137 Abstract.

Physical organic chemistry
Chemical kinetics